Bitter Life is a 1962 Turkish drama film directed by Metin Erksan.

Cast 
 Ayhan Işık - Mehmet
 Türkan Şoray - Nermin 
 Ekrem Bora - Ender
 Nebahat Çehre - Filiz
  - Hasan
  - Belkıs

References

External links 

1962 drama films
1962 films
Turkish drama films
Turkish black-and-white films
1960s Turkish-language films